Artan Pali (born 18 March 1973) is an Albanian former footballer who played as a defender. He made three appearances for the Albania national team from 1992 to 1995.

References

External links
 

1973 births
Living people
Albanian footballers
Association football defenders
Albania international footballers
KF Tirana players
VfL 93 Hamburg players
SpVg Aurich players
BV Cloppenburg players
Place of birth missing (living people)